Octavius Valentine Catto (February 22, 1839 – October 10, 1871) was an American educator, intellectual, and civil rights activist. He became principal of male students at the Institute for Colored Youth, where he had also been educated. Born free in Charleston, South Carolina, in a prominent mixed-race family, he moved north as a boy with his family. After completing his education, he went into teaching, and becoming active in civil rights. He also became known as a top cricket and baseball player in 19th-century Philadelphia, Pennsylvania. A Republican, he was shot and killed in election-day violence in Philadelphia, where ethnic Irish of the Democratic Party, which was anti-Reconstruction and had opposed black suffrage, attacked black men to prevent their voting for Republican candidates.

Early life
Octavius Catto was born free, as his mother was free: Sarah Isabella Cain was a member of the city's prominent mixed-race DeReef family, which had been free for decades and belonged to the Brown Fellowship Society as a mark of their status. His father, William T. Catto, had been a slave millwright in South Carolina and gained his freedom. He was ordained as a Presbyterian minister before taking his family north, first to Baltimore, and then to Philadelphia, where they settled in the free state of Pennsylvania. The state had gradually abolished slavery, beginning before the end of the Revolutionary War.

William T. Catto was a founding member of Philadelphia's Banneker Institute, an African-American intellectual and literary society. He wrote "A Semi-Centenary Discourse," a history of the First African Presbyterian Church in Philadelphia.<ref>{{Citation|title=Delivered in the First African Presbyterian Church, in Philadelphia, on the fourth Sabbath of May, 1857, with a History of the Church from the first organization, including a brief Notice of Rev. John Gloucester, its First Pastor|year=1857|place=Philadelphia|publisher=Joseph M. Wilson|quote=also, An Appendix, containing Sketches of all the Coloured Churches in Philadelphia}}</ref>

Catto began his education at Vaux Primary School and then Lombard Grammar School, institutions specifically for the education of African-American's, in Philadelphia. In 1853, he entered the, otherwise, all-white Allentown Academy in Allentown, New Jersey, located across the Delaware River and 40 miles north. In 1854, when his family returned to Philadelphia, he became a student at that city's Institute for Colored Youth (ICY). Managed by the Society of Friends (Quakers), ICY's curriculum included the classical study of Latin, Greek, geometry, and trigonometry.

While a student at ICY, Catto presented papers and took part in scholarly discussions at "a young men's instruction society". Led by fellow ICY student Jacob C. White Jr., they met weekly at the ICY. Catto graduated from ICY in 1858, winning praise from principal Ebenezer Bassett for "outstanding scholarly work, great energy, and perseverance in school matters." Catto did a year of post-graduate study, including private tutoring in both Greek and Latin, in Washington, D. C.

Activism and influence
In 1859, he returned to Philadelphia, where he was elected full member and Recording Secretary of the Banneker Institute. He also was hired as teacher of English and mathematics at the ICY.

On May 10, 1864, Catto delivered ICY's commencement address, which gave a historical synopsis of the school. In addition, Catto's address touched on the issue of the potential lack of sensitivity of white teachers toward the needs and interests of African-American students:

It is at least unjust to allow a blind and ignorant prejudice to so far disregard the choice of parents and the will of the colored tax-payers, as to appoint over colored children white teachers, whose intelligence and success, measured by the fruits of their labors, could neither obtain nor secure for them positions which we know would be more congenial to their tastes.

Catto also spoke of the Civil War, then in progress. He believed that the United States government had to evolve several times in order to change. He understood that the change must come not necessarily for the benefit of African Americans, but more for America's political and industrial welfare. This would be a mutual benefit for all Americans.

... It is for the purpose of promoting, as far as possible, the preparation of the colored man for the assumption of these new relations with intelligence and with the knowledge which promises success, that the Institute feels called upon at this time to act with more energy and on a broader scale than has heretofore been required.

On January 2, 1865, at a gathering at the National Hall in Philadelphia to celebrate the second anniversary of the Emancipation Proclamation, Catto "delivered a very able address, and one that was a credit to the mind and heart of the speaker."

In 1869, Bassett left ICY when he was appointed ambassador to Haiti. Catto lobbied to succeed Bassett as principal; however, the ICY board chose Catto's fellow teacher, Fanny Jackson Coppin, as head of the school. Catto was elected as the principal of the ICY's male department.References to him as an influence on one of his students, Hershel V. Cashin, can be found in the book,   In 1870, Catto joined the Franklin Institute, a center for science and education whose white leaders supported Catto's membership despite his race, in the face of some opposition. Catto served as principal and teacher at ICY until his death in 1871. His successor in the position was Richard Theodore Greener.

Activist for equal rights
The Civil War increased Catto's activism for abolition and equal rights. He joined with Frederick Douglass and other black leaders to form a Recruitment Committee to sign up black men to fight for the Union and emancipation. After the Confederate invasion of Pennsylvania in 1863, Catto helped raise a company of black volunteers for the state's defense; their help, however, was refused by the staff of Major General Darius N. Couch on the grounds that the men were not authorized to fight. (Couch was later repremanded by US Secretary of War Edwin M. Stanton, but not until the aspiring soldiers had returned to Philadelphia.) Acting with Douglass and the Union League, Catto helped raise eleven regiments of United States Colored Troops in the Philadelphia area. These men were sent to the front and many saw action. Catto was commissioned as a major in the army but never saw action.

On Friday, April 21, 1865, at the State House (Independence Hall) in Philadelphia, Catto presented the regimental flag to Lieutenant Colonel Trippe, commander of the 24th United States Colored Troops. An account of Catto's presentation speech was reported the following day in the Christian Recorder:

In November 1864, Catto was elected to be the Corresponding Secretary of the Pennsylvania Equal Rights League. He also served as Vice President of the State Convention of Colored People held in Harrisburg, Pennsylvania, in February 1865. (Liberator March 3, 1865: 35).

Catto fought for the desegregation of Philadelphia's trolley car system, along with his fiancée Caroline LeCount and abolitionist William Still. The May 18, 1865, issue of the New York Times ran a story discussing the civil disobedience tactics employed by Catto as he fought for civil rights:

A meeting of the Union League of Philadelphia was held in Sansom Street Hall on Thursday, June 21, 1866, to protest and denounce the forcible ejection of several black women from Philadelphia's street cars. At this meeting, Catto presented the following resolutions:

Later enlisting the help of Congressmen Thaddeus Stevens and William D. Kelley, Catto was instrumental in the passage of a Pennsylvania bill that prohibited segregation on transit systems in the state. Publicity about a conductor's being fined who refused to admit Catto's fiancée to a Philadelphia streetcar helped establish the new law in practice.

Catto's crusade for equal rights was capped in March 1869, when Pennsylvania voted to ratify the 15th Amendment, which prohibited discrimination against citizens in registration and voting based on race, color or prior condition; effectively, it provided suffrage to black men. (No women then had the vote.) It was fully ratified in 1870.

Sportsman
Catto was active not just in the public arenas of education and equal rights, but also on the sporting field. Like many other young men of Philadelphia, both white and black, Catto began playing cricket while in school, as it was a British tradition. Later he took up the American sport of baseball. Following the Civil War, he helped establish Philadelphia as a major hub of what became Negro league baseball. Along with Jacob C. White, Jr., he ran the Pythian Base Ball Club of Philadelphia. The Pythians had an undefeated season in 1867.

Following the 1867 season, Catto, with support from players from the white Athletic Base Ball Club, applied for the Pythians' admission into the newly formed Pennsylvania Base Ball Association. As it became clear that they would lose any vote by the Association, they withdrew their application. In 1869, the Pythians challenged various white baseball teams in Philadelphia to games. The Olympic Ball Club accepted the challenge. The first match game between black and white baseball teams took place on September 4, 1869, ending in the Pythians' defeat, 44 to 23. (New York Times, September 5, 1869)

Street murder

On Election Day, October 10, 1871, Catto was teaching in Philadelphia. Fights broke out in the city between black and white voters, as the elections were high in tension and parties reflected racial opposition. Black voters, who were mostly Republican, faced intimidation and violence from white voters, especially ethnic Irish, who were partisans of the city's Democratic machine. Irish immigrants had entered the city in great numbers during and after the Great Famine of the 1840s; they competed with free blacks for jobs and housing. City police were called on to quell the violence. Instead, often ethnic Irish themselves, they exacerbated the problems, using their power to prevent black citizens from voting. A Lieutenant Haggerty was later arrested for having encouraged police under his command to keep African Americans from voting.

On his way to vote, Catto was intermittently harassed by whites. Police reports indicate that he had purchased a revolver for protection. At the intersection of Ninth and South streets, Catto was accosted by Frank Kelly, an ethnic Irish man, who shot him three times. Catto died of his wounds. The city inquest was not able to determine if Catto had pulled his own gun. Kelly was not convicted of assault or murder.

Catto's military funeral at Lebanon Cemetery in Passyunk was well-attended. The murder of Catto, an important leader, and violence throughout the election, coupled with the resurgence of the anti-Reconstruction Democratic Party in the city, marked the beginning of a decline in black militancy in 19th-century Philadelphia. Later, after the cemetery was closed down, Catto's remains were reinterred at Eden Cemetery, in Collingdale, Pennsylvania.

O. V. Catto Memorial
On June 17, 1878, R. W. Wallace, a biographer of Catto, wrote to the Christian Recorder, questioning why no one was taking care of Catto's grave:

Can you inform me through your paper, why there is no care taken of Prof. O. V. Catto's grave? I have recently been down to the Cemetery and was surprised to see its condition. Thousands of people have asked me about the same thing, and, when I am compelled to say there is no sign of any stone to his grave, while both white and colored stand ready to help in the matter, it is not creditable to us. Something ought to be done in the matter. I believe almost everybody would give something toward getting a stone. I am the publisher of his life, and am prepared to speak in regard to the interest taken by all classes of people. (Wallace 1878)

Some twenty years later, the New York Times reported:

21st century memorial campaign

An annual remembrance ceremony was initiated in 1995.

On June 14, 2006, the Board of Trustees of the O. V. Catto Memorial announced the kickoff of a $1.5 million fundraising campaign to erect a memorial statue to Catto. The Abraham Lincoln Foundation made the first contribution of $25,000. On October 10, 2007, the 136th anniversary of Catto's death, the Octavius V. Catto Memorial Fund erected a headstone at Catto's burial site at Eden Cemetery in Collingdale, Pennsylvania.

On July 26, 2011, to commemorate his life, the General Meade Society of Philadelphia participated in a wreath-laying ceremony at 6th and Lombard Streets in Philadelphia, Pennsylvania. The first OV Catto award was presented that year.

To honor the man affectionately called the "19th century Martin Luther King", Mayor Jim Kenney announced on June 10, 2016, that a new sculpture to commemorate Catto and other leaders would be erected outside Philadelphia City Hall.

The sculptural group, A Quest for Parity'', including a twelve-foot bronze statue of Catto, was installed at Philadelphia's City Hall on September 24, 2017, and dedicated on September 26, 2017. The sculptor is Branly Cadet. It is the first public monument in Philadelphia to honor a specific African American.

See also
1865 Pennsylvania State Equal Rights League Convention

References

Bibliography

Further reading

External links

1839 births
1871 deaths
1871 murders in the United States
African-American activists
19th-century American educators
Burials at Eden Cemetery (Collingdale, Pennsylvania)
Burials at Lebanon Cemetery
Educators from Philadelphia
Educators from South Carolina
Pennsylvania Republicans
African-American educators
African Americans in the American Civil War
Cheyney University of Pennsylvania alumni
People from Charleston, South Carolina
Deaths by firearm in Pennsylvania
Murdered African-American people
People murdered in Pennsylvania
Activists for African-American civil rights
People of Pennsylvania in the American Civil War
Racially motivated violence against African Americans
African-American college graduates before 1865